Rubén Noberto Bravo (16 November 1923 – 24 August 1977) was an Argentine football manager and player who played as a forward for clubs in Argentina, Chile and France. He made three appearances for the Argentina national team in 1950 and 1951 scoring once.

After he retired from playing, Bravo became a football coach. He died while managing Talleres de Córdoba in 1977 at the age of 53.

Career
Bravo played for OGC Nice from 1954 to 1957.

Honours
Nice
 French Division 1: 1956
 Trophée des Champions: runner-up 1956

References

External links
 

1923 births
1977 deaths
Argentine footballers
Association football forwards
Argentina international footballers
Chilean Primera División players
Rosario Central footballers
Racing Club de Avellaneda footballers
Botafogo de Futebol e Regatas players
Club Deportivo Palestino footballers
OGC Nice players
Grenoble Foot 38 players
Pays d'Aix FC players
FC Rouen players
CO Roubaix-Tourcoing players
Argentine football managers
AS Monaco FC managers
Independiente Santa Fe managers
Talleres de Córdoba managers
Argentine expatriate footballers
Argentine expatriate football managers
Argentine expatriate sportspeople in Chile
Expatriate footballers in Chile
Argentine expatriate sportspeople in France
Expatriate footballers in France
Argentine expatriate sportspeople in Monaco